A.F.C. Aldermaston is a football club based in Aldermaston, Berkshire, England.

The club motto, Facta Non Verba, comes from a Latin phrase meaning "deeds, not words".

History
The club was founded as AWRE Football Club in 1952 by Charles Green, Ted Hall, Gordon Carter, and Don Sharp, and were nicknamed "the Atom Men" after the newly founded Atomic Weapons Research Establishment. As the AWRE complex was still under construction when the club was established, the players used empty contractors' huts as changing rooms – carrying the tin bath into whichever building was designated for that day's football. The players were also responsible for the pitch, and would mow and mark out the pitch before the match started. The club received support from William Penney during his work at AWRE on the Operation Hurricane project.

In the late 1960s/early 1970s, the club was asked to change its name, and became AFC Aldermaston. In 1979 they were promoted from the Reading & District League into Division One of the Hellenic League, where they spent the next seven seasons. From 1986 until 1991 the club played in local football leagues, including the North Hampshire League, before joining Division Three of the Hampshire League in 1991. They finished fifth in their first season, earning promotion to Division Two. However, they were relegated back to Division Three the following season, where they remained until 1999. Upon reorganisation of the Hampshire League prior to the 1999–2000 season, Aldermaston were placed in the Premier Division.

When the Hampshire and Wessex Leagues merged in 2004, Aldermaston became members of Division Two of the Wessex League. They were relegated to Division Three at the end of the 2004–05 season. The division was renamed Division Two in 2006, and was disbanded at the end of the 2006–07 season, with Aldermaston moved up to Division One.

During the 2009–10 season, the club lost 40 consecutive games, breaking the previous record of 39 straight losses held jointly by Stockport United and Poole Town. The 40th defeat came on 8 April 2010, a 2–0 loss to Downton. This led to news reports proclaiming them the "worst English football team in history" as well as gaining international attention. Chairman Damion Bone stated that he believed that the poor performance over the season was due to players' commitments; the club had also lost ten players to Tadley Calleva before the start of the season. The losing streak ended on 10 April 2010, when the club drew 1–1 against Warminster Town, with the following match against Petersfield Town resulting in a 2–1 win for Aldermaston.

The run of defeats saw the club finish bottom of Division One with just one win in 40 matches, resulting in relegation to the Hampshire Premier League, At the end of the 2013–14 season, they switched to the Premier Division of the Thames Valley Premier Football League. After finishing seventh in the Premier Division in 2015–16, the club were promoted to Division One East of the Hellenic League. At the end of the 2020–21 season they were transferred to Division One of the Combined Counties League.

Season-by-season record

Ground
The club's base is at the Recreational Society (commonly abbreviated to "Rec Soc") at the Atomic Weapons Establishment in Aldermaston, having been founded shortly after the complex's establishment. The ground has three full-sized football pitches. Until 1990, the society's Head Groundsman was Eddie Seaward. After leaving Aldermaston, Seaward became Head Groundsman at Wimbledon's All England Lawn Tennis Club, and received an MBE in 2007 for services to sport.

Prior to the 2021–22 season the club's first team moved their home games to Thatcham Town's Waterside Park as the Rec Soc ground no longer met the ground grading requirements for their level.

Records
Highest league position: 7th in Hellenic League Division One, 1979–80

See also
A.F.C. Aldermaston managers

References

External links
Official website
Football In Berkshire - AFC Aldermaston

Football clubs in England
Football clubs in Berkshire
Association football clubs established in 1952
1952 establishments in England
Works association football teams in England
Hellenic Football League
North Hants League
Hampshire League
Wessex Football League
Hampshire Premier League
Thames Valley Premier Football League
Combined Counties Football League